North Gujarat, the Northern part of Indian state  of Gujarat includes the districts of Gandhinagar, Banaskantha, Sabarkantha, Aravalli, Mehsana, and Patan.

North Gujarat is dominant in the dairy industry.

Currently, the water table of the region is dropping 6 meters every year.

The dialects of Gujarati in this region differ from each other and from dialects in other parts with minor differences. All dialects have the common difference from Gujarati in that the word "chhe" is replaced by "she" or "sh".

References 

Regions of Gujarat